Henry Clegg (8 December 1850 – 30 December 1920) was an English first-class cricketer, who played six matches for Yorkshire County Cricket Club in 1881.  He also appeared for T Emmett's XI in first-class matches in 1881 and 1883.

Born in Birstall, near Batley, Yorkshire, England, Clegg was a right hand batsman, who scored 96 runs at 10.66,  with a top score of 27. He also played for Northumberland in the Minor Counties Cricket Championship in 1884.  He played for the Dewsbury and Savile club in the 1890s, and spent a year at Little Lever C.C. in Bolton, as joint groundsman.  He worked as a woollen cloth finisher, according to the census of 1881, and had a wife, Hannah and a son, James.

Clegg died aged 70, in December 1920, in Dewsbury, Yorkshire.

References

External links
Cricinfo Profile
Cricket Archive Statistics

1850 births
1920 deaths
Yorkshire cricketers
People from Birstall, West Yorkshire
English cricketers
Sportspeople from Yorkshire